USS LST-470 was a United States Navy  used in the Asiatic-Pacific Theater during World War II. As with many of her class, the ship was never named. Instead, she was referred to by her hull designation.

Construction
The ship was laid down on 26 October 1942, under Maritime Commission (MARCOM) contract, MC hull 990, by  Kaiser Shipyards, Vancouver, Washington; launched 30 November 1942; and commissioned on 9 March 1943.

Service history  
During the war, LST-470 was assigned to the Pacific Theater of Operations. She took part in the Eastern New Guinea operations, the Lae occupation in September 1943, and the Saidor occupation in January 1944; the Bismarck Archipelago operations, the Cape Gloucester, New Britain landings in December 1943, and the Admiralty Islands landings in March 1944; Hollandia operation in April 1944; the Western New Guinea operations, the Biak Islands operation in May and June 1944, the Cape Sansapor operation in July and August 1944, and the Morotai landing in September 1944; the Leyte operation in October and November 1944; the Lingayen Gulf landings in January 1945; the consolidation and capture of the Southern Philippines, the Palawan Island landings in February and March 1945, the Mindanao Island landings in April 1945; and the Borneo operation, the Balikpapan operation in June and July 1945.

Following the war, LST-470 returned to the United States and was decommissioned on 4 March 1946, and struck from the Navy list on 5 June, that same year. On 4 November 1947, the tank landing ship was sold to Dulien Steel Products, Inc., Seattle, Washington, and subsequently scrapped.

Honors and awards
LST-470 earned eight battle stars for her World War II service.

Notes 

Citations

Bibliography 

Online resources

External links

 

LST-1-class tank landing ships of the United States Navy
1942 ships
World War II amphibious warfare vessels of the United States
S3-M2-K2 ships
Ships built in Vancouver, Washington